Sudanese Ba'ath Party (Ḥizb al-Ba‘th al-Sūdānī) is a political party in Sudan. It is said to be neutral to the Syria-Iraq split within Ba'athist politics.

History
The party emerged from a split within the pro-Iraqi Arab Socialist Ba'ath Party – Country of Sudan in 2002. Another Sudanese faction, led by Kamal Bolad remained in the pan-Arab party.

Prominent members
In 2010, Mohamed Ali Jadein was a prominent member of the Sudanese Ba'ath Party. In 2013, his group was viewed as having split from the "Ba'ath (Sudan Region) Party".

References

2002 establishments in Sudan
Arab nationalism in Sudan
Ba'ath Party breakaway groups
Ba'athist parties
Ba'ath Party
Political parties established in 2002
Political parties in Sudan
Socialist parties in Sudan